The Most Reverend Edward French (?–29 April 1810) was an Irish Roman Catholic clergyman who served as the Bishop of Elphin from 1787 to 1810.

References

1810 deaths
Roman Catholic bishops of Elphin
Year of birth unknown